Cosmopterix cognita is a moth in the  family Cosmopterigidae. It was described by Walsingham in 1891. It is found in South Africa.

References

Natural History Museum Lepidoptera generic names catalog

Endemic moths of South Africa
Moths described in 1891
cognita